IC 2497 is a spiral galaxy close to the intergalactic cloud Hanny's Voorwerp. The galaxy is a former quasar, whose light lit up Hanny's Voorwerp, which is now a light echo of that extinct quasar. The quasar shut down sometime in the last 70,000 years. This revises current theories of quasar operation, as the quasar is quiescent, shutting down much faster than was thought possible, and is much cooler than predicted. The galaxy is currently 100 to 10,000 times dimmer than it was when its quasar burned into Hanny's Voorwerp.

References

Further reading

External links
 

Leo Minor
Spiral galaxies
2497
165538
09380+3457